The Benetton B197 is a Formula One racing car with which the Benetton team competed in the 1997 Formula One World Championship. There it was driven by Frenchman Jean Alesi and Austrian Gerhard Berger, who were both in their second season with the team. However, Berger was forced to sit out three races in the middle of the season due to sinus problems, and compatriot Alexander Wurz made his F1 début by deputising for him, starting at the Canadian Grand Prix.

The car is a further development of the previous year's B196, from which both drivers had struggled to extract maximum performance. The B197 proved competitive at nearly every race, but only scored one win, courtesy of Berger on his return to the cockpit in Germany. The main problem with the car was its inability to bring its tyres up to temperature on low-grip circuits, particularly in qualifying. However, Berger and Alesi did secure one pole position each during the course of the season.

The team eventually finished third in the Constructors' Championship, with 67 points. Both B197 cars are still actively used, competing in the BOSS GP Series as of 2022.

Complete Formula One results
(key) (results in bold indicate pole position; results in italics indicate fastest lap)

References

AUTOCOURSE 1997–98, Henry, Alan (ed.), Hazleton Publishing Ltd. (1997)

External links

B197
1997 Formula One season cars